Sanctuary Glacier is a glacier almost completely encircled by the Gothic Mountains. It drains west between Outlook Peak and Organ Pipe Peaks into Scott Glacier. Mapped by United States Geological Survey (USGS) from surveys and U.S. Navy aerial photographs, 1960–64. The descriptive name was proposed by Edmund Stump, leader of a United States Antarctic Research Program (USARP)-Arizona State University geological party which established a base camp on the glacier in January 1981.

Glaciers of Amundsen Coast